The Twelfth Van Cliburn International Piano Competition took  place in Fort Worth, Texas from May 20 to June 5, 2005. It was won by Russian pianist Alexander Kobrin, while Joyce Yang and Sa Chen were awarded the Silver and bronze medals.

Jurors
  John Giordano (chairman)
  Marcello Abbado
  Peter Cossé
  Richard Dyer
  Claude Frank
  Thomas Frost
  Joseph Kalichstein
  Jürgen Meyer-Josten
  Menahem Pressler
  Tadeusz Strugala
  Guangren Zhou

Links
13th Van Cliburn International Competition

Results

See also
Thirteenth Van Cliburn International Piano Competition

References

Van Cliburn International Piano Competition